Hans Garrett Moore  (31 March 1834 – 6 October 1889), born in Carlingford, County Louth, Ireland, was an Irish recipient of the Victoria Cross, the highest and most prestigious award for gallantry in the face of the enemy that can be awarded to British and Commonwealth forces.

Details
He was 43 years old, and a major in the 88th Regiment (later The Connaught Rangers), British Army during the Ninth Cape Frontier War when the following deed took place for which he was awarded the VC.

On 29 December 1877 near Komgha, South Africa, during an action with the Gaikas, Major Moore saw that a private of the Frontier Mounted Police was unable to mount his horse and was left at the mercy of the enemy. Realising the danger, Major Moore rode back alone in the midst of the enemy, and continued in his efforts to save the man's life until the latter was killed. The major shot two and received an assegai in the arm during this gallant attempt.

Later life
He later achieved the rank of colonel. He died at Lough Derg, County Tipperary on 6 October 1889 whilst attempting to save a life and was buried at Mount Jerome Cemetery, Dublin, Ireland.

The medal
The medal is on display in the MuseuMAfricA, Johannesburg, South Africa.

References

Listed in order of publication year
The Register of the Victoria Cross (1981, 1988 and 1997)

Ireland's VCs  (Dept of Economic Development, 1995)
Monuments to Courage (David Harvey, 1999)
Irish Winners of the Victoria Cross (Richard Doherty & David Truesdale, 2000)

External links
Location of grave and VC medal (Dublin)

1834 births
1889 deaths
19th-century Irish people
People from Carlingford, County Louth
Companions of the Order of the Bath
88th Regiment of Foot (Connaught Rangers) officers
Burials at Mount Jerome Cemetery and Crematorium
British military personnel of the 9th Cape Frontier War
Irish recipients of the Victoria Cross
British Army recipients of the Victoria Cross
Deaths by drowning